New Jersey's 27th Legislative District is one of 40 in the New Jersey Legislature. As of the 2011 apportionment, the district includes the Essex municipalities of Caldwell, Essex Fells, Livingston, Maplewood, Millburn, Roseland, South Orange, and West Orange, and the Morris County municipalities of Chatham Township, East Hanover, Florham Park, Hanover, Harding Township and Madison.

Demographic characteristics
As of the 2020 United States census, the district had a population of 233,779, of whom 180,070 (77.0%) were of voting age. The racial makeup of the district was 144,266 (61.7%) White, 30,118 (12.9%) African American, 521 (0.2%) Native American, 30,448 (13.0%) Asian, 76 (0.0%) Pacific Islander, 9,681 (4.1%) from some other race, and 18,669 (8.0%) from two or more races. Hispanic or Latino of any race were 23,424 (10.0%) of the population. 

The 27th District had 189,871 registered voters as of December 1, 2021, of whom 67,129 (35.4%) were registered as unaffiliated, 82,983 (43.7%) were registered as Democrats, 38,706 (20.4%) were registered as Republicans, and 1,053 (0.6%) were registered to other parties.

The district includes a number of comparatively wealthy communities in Western Essex County, as well as a number of relatively poor areas close to Newark. The 27th district had one of the lowest percentages in the state of registered Republicans, with Democrats outnumbering Republicans by a more than 2–1 margin.

Political representation
For the 2022–2023 session, the district is represented in the State Senate by Richard Codey (D, Roseland) and in the General Assembly by Mila Jasey (D, South Orange) and John F. McKeon (D, West Orange).

The legislative district overlaps with 10th and 11th congressional districts.

Apportionment history
In the original creation of the 40-district legislative map in 1973, the 27th District consisted of the northern Essex County municipalities of Nutley, Bloomfield, Glen Ridge, Montclair, Cedar Grove, Verona, Caldwell, and Essex Fells. For the 1981 redistricting, the 27th consisted of the four municipalities of The Oranges: South Orange, West Orange, Orange, and East Orange and a small sliver of the North Ward of Newark. In the next redistricting in 1991, Montclair was added to the district and some Newark wards were removed. With declining population through western Essex County, most of that side of the county made up the 27th District following the 2001 redistricting including Maplewood, Livingston, Fairfield Township, and The Caldwells. East Orange and the portions of the North Ward of Newark were removed but a small portion of Upper Vailsburg, Newark was included in the district this decade.

Changes to the district made as part of the New Jersey Legislative reapportionment in 2011 removed the district's share of Newark while adding Millburn in Essex County, and the Republican-leaning Morris County municipalities of Chatham Township, East Hanover, Florham Park, Hanover Township, Harding Township and Madison. This made the district slightly more Republican than its predecessor. Shifted out of the district were Fairfield Township, North Caldwell and West Caldwell (to District 26) and Orange (to District 34).

Election history

Election results

Senate

General Assembly

References

Essex County, New Jersey
Morris County, New Jersey
27